Sari, Sara, or Sarah Wilson may refer to:

Writers
Sarah Wilson (war correspondent) (1865–1929), English war correspondent and aunt of Winston Churchill
Sarah Ella Wilson (1874–1955), American educator; pioneering black schoolteacher in 1895
Sarah Wilson (art historian), British art historian; works published since 1980
Sarah L. Wilson (born 1959), American jurist and member of Columbia Human Rights Law Review
Sarah Wilson (dog trainer) (born 1960), American author and dog trainer
Sari Wilson, American writer and editor; Stegner Fellow 1997–99
Sarah Wilson (journalist) (born 1974), Australian TV presenter

Others
Sarah Wilson (impostor) (1754–after 1780), English impostor of the non-existent sister of Queen Charlotte
Sarah Maria Wilson (before 1756–1786), English actress; stage names Mrs. Weston and Mrs. Wilson
Sarah Wilson (1922–1998), American winner of 10th Scripps National Spelling Bee
Sarah Wilson (rugby union) (born 1984), American rugby union player

Fictional characters
Sara Wilson in 2005 American film Cinderella Man
Sara Wilson (The Passage) in American novels published between 2010 and 2016
Sarah Wilson in 2017 American film Geostorm